John Light may refer to:
 John Light (actor) (born 1973), English cinema, television and theatre actor
 John H. Light, American lawyer, politician from the state of Connecticut, and Connecticut Attorney General

See also
 Light (surname)